Sir Edward Johnson Wayne  (3 June 1902 – 19 August 1990) was an English physician, biochemist, thyroidologist, and professor of medicine.

Biography
Wayne attended Leeds Central High School from 1914 to 1920 and then matriculated at the University of Leeds, graduating there in 1923 BSc in chemistry and in 1924 MSc after working on organic chemistry. He then went to the University of Manchester to do research under Hugh Stanley Raper on the intermediary metabolism of the fatty acids. Wayne graduated there in 1925 with a PhD.

He took classes in anatomy and physiology during a postdoctoral year of research at Manchester and then returned in 1926 to Leeds to study medicine, graduating MB, ChB in 1929. From 1930 to 1931 he was a demonstrator in physiology at the University of Leeds.

From 1931 to 1934 Wayne worked as an assistant under the cardiologist Thomas Lewis in the department of clinical research at University College Hospital, London. He qualified MRCP in 1932. From 1934 to 1953 he was Professor of Pharmacology and Therapeutics at the University of Sheffield, "establishing a reputation as a clinical scientist and as a talented director of research." He also became an associate physician to Sheffield Royal Infirmary. He was elected FRCP in 1937 and graduated MD in 1938. In 1953, as successor to Sir John William McNee, Wayne was appointed Regius Professor of the Practice of Medicine at Glasgow University. He held the professorship until his retirement as professor emeritus in 1967.

He was the Bradshaw Lecturer in 1953 and the Lumleian Lecturer in 1959. He was elected FRCPE in 1955. He was knighted in 1964.

In 1932 in Scarborough, North Yorkshire he married Honora Nancy Halloran. Upon his death in 1990 he was survived by his widow, a son, and a daughter.

Wayne's diagnostic index
By using a statistical procedure partially based on discriminant analysis, James Crooks, I. P. C. Murray, and Edward J. Wayne developed a clinical diagnostic index (sometimes called the "Wayne score") in thyrotoxicosis. The procedure allocates a positive or negative score to each clinical feature and provides a numerical estimate of the degree of severity of the disease.

Older generations of endocrinologists were familiar with the use of Wayne's score and Billewicz's score for clinical diagnoses of hyperthyroidism and hypothyroidism, respectively. Contemporary medical textbooks have discarded those two diagnostic scores as old-fashioned. However, various scoring and grading systems in clinical thyroidology might still have value.

Selected publications

Articles

with J. F. Goodwin and H. B. Stoner: 
with John L. Emery, L. M. Rose, and Sheila M. Stewart: 
with J. F. Goodwin and R. Steiner: 
with J. Colquhoun and Joyce Burke
with Alastair G. Macgregor: 
with G. W. Blomfield, A. G. Macgregor, and H. Miller: 

with E. K. Blackburn, Joyce Burke, and Cissie Roseman: 
 (Bradshaw Lecture)

with G. W. Blomfield, J. C. Jones, A. G. Macgregor, H. Miller, and R. S. Weetch: 
with A. G. Macgregor: 
with F. P. Muldowney and M. M. Bluhm: 
with Russell Fraser and Selwyn Taylor: 
with J. Crooks: 
 (1st of 2 Lumleian Lectures)
 (2nd of 2 Lumleian Lectures)
with James Crooks, W. Watson Buchanan, and E. MacDonald: 
with J. J. R. Duthie, R. H. Girdwood, Douglas Hubble, A. G. Macgregor, Andrew Wilson, and G. M. Wilson: 
with W. Watson Buchanan, W. D. Alexander, J. Crooks, D. A. Koutras, J. R. Anderson, and R. B. Goudie: 
with William D. Alexander, D. A. Koutras, J. Crooks, W. W. Buchanan, E. M. MacDonald, and M. H. Richmond:

Books
with Demetrios A Koutras and William De Witt Alexander:

References

External links

1902 births
1990 deaths
20th-century British medical doctors
Alumni of the University of Leeds
Alumni of the University of Manchester
British biochemists
British endocrinologists
Fellows of the Royal College of Physicians
Fellows of the Royal College of Physicians of Edinburgh
Knights Bachelor